The 1995 World Indoor Target Archery Championships were held in Birmingham, England.

Medal summary (Men's individual)

Medal summary (Women's individual)

Medal summary (Men's team)

Medal summary (Women's team)

References

E
1995 in English sport
International archery competitions hosted by the United Kingdom
International sports competitions in Birmingham, West Midlands